The Ray Guy Award is presented annually to college football's most outstanding punter as adjudged by the Augusta Sports Council. The award is named after punter Ray Guy, an All-American for Southern Mississippi and an All-Pro in the National Football League for the Oakland Raiders.

Nominees are evaluated on their overall statistics and contribution to the team. Particular emphasis is placed on the following statistics: net average, percentage of total punts inside the 20-yard line, and percentage of punts not returned. The Ray Guy Award winner is determined by a national selection committee of football writers, FBS college coaches, sports information directors, and past Ray Guy Award winners. The winner must display team leadership, self-discipline, and have a positive impact on the team's success.

Winners

References
General
 

Footnotes

External links
Official website

College football national player awards
Awards established in 2000